Jaílton da Cruz Alves (born April 19, 1982, in Aracaju), or simply Jaílton, is a Brazilian defensive midfielder, he currently plays for Fortaleza.

Career 
On 14 May 2009 the defender has been released by Fluminense upon his own request, he has been unable to play due to recurrent injuries throughout this season. Jailton was a free agent and on 15 May 2009 Coritiba signed him on a free transfer.

Flamengo career statistics
(Correct  December 7, 2008)

Honours
Taça Guanabara: 2007, 2008
Rio de Janeiro State League: 2007, 2008

References

External links

 
zerozero.pt 

1982 births
Living people
Brazilian footballers
Club Sportivo Sergipe players
América Futebol Clube (MG) players
Tupi Football Club players
Ipatinga Futebol Clube players
Vitória S.C. players
C.F. Estrela da Amadora players
CR Flamengo footballers
Fluminense FC players
Coritiba Foot Ball Club players
Fortaleza Esporte Clube players
Association football central defenders
People from Aracaju
Sportspeople from Sergipe